The sulphur-rumped myiobius or sulphur-rumped flycatcher (Myiobius sulphureipygius) is a species of passerine bird in the family Tityridae. It is found in Belize, Colombia, Costa Rica, Ecuador, Guatemala, Honduras, Mexico, Nicaragua, and Panama. Its natural habitat is subtropical or tropical moist lowland forests.

This flycatcher measures . It has an olive-brown head and upper back, blackish wings and tail, and a tawny breast and sides. The face and eye ring are grey while the throat is whitish. The namesake rump patch is light yellow and extends to the mid-back. The belly is also yellow, as is a small crest.

Often found near streams, the sulphur-rumped myiobius participates in mixed-species flocks that move through the lower levels of the forest.

This bird often displays its rump patch by fanning its tail and dropping its wings. Its call is a sharp psit.

References

Further reading

External links

 
 
 
 
 
 

sulphur-rumped myiobius
Birds of Central America
Birds of the Tumbes-Chocó-Magdalena
sulphur-rumped myiobius
sulphur-rumped myiobius
Taxonomy articles created by Polbot